Chrysocale splendens is a moth of the subfamily Arctiinae. It was described by Paul Dognin in 1888. It is found in Ecuador.

References

Euchromiina
Moths described in 1888